"The Correct Way to Kill" is the ninth episode of the fifth series of the 1960s cult British spy-fi television series The Avengers, starring Patrick Macnee and Diana Rigg, and guest starring Anna Quayle, Michael Gough, Philip Madoc, and Terence Alexander. It was first broadcast in the Southern and Tyne Tees regions of the ITV network on Wednesday 8 March 1967. ABC Weekend Television, who commissioned the show for ITV, broadcast it in its own regions three days later on Saturday 11 March. The episode was directed by Charles Crichton, and written by Brian Clemens.

Plot
Soviet agents are being hunted down and killed by sharp dressed villains prompting Steed and Emma to team up with Soviet agents Olga and Nutski.

Cast
Patrick Macnee as John Steed
Diana Rigg as Emma Peel
Anna Quayle as Olga
Michael Gough as Nutski
Philip Madoc as Ivan
Terence Alexander as Ponsonby
Peter Barkworth as Percy
Graham Armitage as Algy
Timothy Bateson as Merryweather
Joanna Jones as Hilda
Edwin Apps as Winters
John G. Heller as Groski

References

External links

Episode overview on The Avengers Forever! website

The Avengers (season 5) episodes